James Giles Hampton (June 13, 1814 – September 22, 1861) was an American Whig Party politician who represented New Jersey's 1st congressional district in the United States House of Representatives from 1845 to 1849.

Hampton was born in Bridgeton, New Jersey on June 13, 1814. He attended the common schools and was graduated from Princeton College in 1835. He studied law, was admitted to the bar in 1839 and commenced practice in Bridgeton. He was collector of the port of Bridgeton from 1841-1844.

Hampton was elected as a Whig to the Twenty-ninth and Thirtieth Congresses, serving in office from March 4, 1845 to March 3, 1849, but was not a candidate for renomination in 1848.

After leaving Congress, he resumed the practice of law in Bridgeton. He was solicitor of the Board of Chosen Freeholders of Cumberland County in 1852. He died in Bridgeton on September 22, 1861, and was interred in that city's Old Broad Street Presbyterian Church Cemetery.

External links

James Giles Hampton at The Political Graveyard

1814 births
1861 deaths
People from Bridgeton, New Jersey
Whig Party members of the United States House of Representatives from New Jersey
New Jersey lawyers
Princeton University alumni
Burials in New Jersey
19th-century American lawyers